Jude Nzochukwu Njoku better known as Jude Njoku is a Nigerian professor of Agricultural economics. He served as the 4th Vice-Chancellor of Federal University of Technology Owerri from 2000 to 2005.

References 

Nigerian academics
Igbo academics
Vice-Chancellors of Federal University of Technology Owerri
Year of birth missing (living people)
Living people
People from Owerri